Nadeem Malik may refer to:

 Nadeem Malik (journalist) (born 1968), Pakistani journalist
 Nadeem Malik (cricketer) (born 1982), English cricketer